Dizzy Spells may refer to:

 "Dizzy Spells" (song), a song by Benny Goodman, Lionel Hampton, and Teddy Wilson
 Dizzy Spells (album), a 2001 album by Dutch anarchist band The Ex